"Now You Has Jazz" is a song written by Cole Porter for the 1956 film High Society in which it was introduced by Bing Crosby and Louis Armstrong. The song describes what instruments are needed to create jazz.

Background
Sol C. Siegel, the producer of High Society, paid Cole Porter $250,000 for his first film score in eight years. When Porter learned that Louis Armstrong was going to appear in the film, he decided he had to write a jazz song. To help with his research, he called Fred Astaire and suggested they attend a Jazz at the Philharmonic concert. Later, he spoke to jazz impresario Norman Granz on the telephone, and Granz gave him a short introductory course in jazz terms. The result was "Now You Has Jazz."

Notable recordings
Bing Crosby and Louis Armstrong and the All Stars recorded the song on January 18, 1956 for the film soundtrack. This version was issued on the High Society album. An edited version was issued as a single and appeared briefly in the No. 88 spot in Billboard magazine. The band's personnel included Louis Armstrong, Trummy Young, Edmond Hall, Billy Kyle, Arvell Shaw, and Barrett Deems.

Four of these musicians were incorrectly identified in that scene, with Young introduced as Hall, Hall as Young, Kyle as Shaw, and Shaw as Kyle. At one point earlier in the movie, Crosby even greets Hall by saying "Hello Trummy." In a television special later that year with Crosby and the band, the error was corrected and the musicians accurately identified. In a live performance by the All Stars in which Young replaced Crosby, Armstrong laughingly introduced Young as "Bing Crosby in technicolor".

References

Songs written by Cole Porter
Bing Crosby songs
Louis Armstrong songs
1956 songs
Songs about jazz